Gramado is a small tourist city, southeast of Caxias do Sul and east of Nova Petrópolis in the southern Brazilian state of Rio Grande do Sul, in the Serra Gaúcha region.  The city was originally settled by Azorean descendants and later received a contingent of German and Italian immigrants. Gramado is one of the cities along the scenic route known as Rota Romântica (Romantic Route).

History

Gramado was originally settled in 1875 by Portuguese immigrants. Five years later, the first German immigrants arrived and these were followed shortly after by Italian immigrants from the Italian settlements in Caxias do Sul.

In 1913, the city seat was moved to Linha Nova, the location of the present-day city center. At this time, Gramado was an unincorporated city within the city of Taquara. A railway, brought by Gramado's founder and first administrator, José Nicoletti Filho, arrived in the city in 1921, boosting the local economy. Gramado officially became a city in 1937, when Gramado was already known as a summer holiday resort. Gramado became a city on 15 December 1954 by force of State Act 2,522.

Politics and Government
Gramado Government is in a strong mayor-council government model, as set forth by the Brazilian Constitution of 1988. Elections for both mayoral and legislative offices are held every fourth year. The Mayor may seek reelection once, while Councilmen have no restriction on terms they may serve.

Executive Branch

Executive powers are held by the Mayor of Gramado, who appoints a Cabinet, the heads of several municipal bodies and members of the Planning Commission. The current Mayor is Nestor Tissot (PP) elected in 2008. The current Deputy Mayor is Luia Barbacovi. In the election of 2016 the opposition candidate won, thereby Fedoca Bertolucci takes the City Hall on 1 January 2017.

Geography

Open spaces
Gramado has several green areas.  Among the most important are Black Lake, Communications Square, Knorr Park, Orchard Park, Major Nicoletti Square and Roses Square.

Lago Negro

Lago Negro (Black Lake) is the most known, visited green area of Gramado. It was created in 1953 by Leopoldo Rosenfeld on an area containing a large concentration of hydrangeas, hence the name the Hydrangeas' Region.  It was named Black Lake because Rosenfeld imported the trees surrounding the lake from Germany's Black Forest.<https://gramadoinesquecivel.tur.br/en/what-to-do/lagos-14/lago-negro-12> This area had been destroyed by fire in 1942.

A creek was dammed up to create a U-shaped lake. Rosenfeld imported pine seedlings from the Black Forest in Germany to be planted all around the newly formed lake's rim.

Lago Negro is a 1.6 kilometers away from the Town Hall. There is a boathouse, working daily from 08:30 to 19:00, where you can rent swan boats to tour the lake, concession stands, public restrooms, and a small craftsmen fair nearby.

The city is in a mountain range, averaging 850 meters above sea level. Visitors from the Northern Hemisphere mid-latitudes may notice several tree species (including Red Maple, American Sweetgum and American Tuliptree) common to their home territory in cultivation here, flourishing among the native Parana Pine. Hydrangeas blossom in late spring.

Climate 
The climate is maritime temperate with mild summer (Cfb, according to the Köppen climate classification). There are some hotter days, but with always pleasant evenings, moderated by mountain air and forests. Winters are cool, with temperatures sometimes falling below , heavy frosts and occasional snowfall.

Culture and tourism

Festival de Gramado, a major South American film festival and Gramado's most important event; 
Natal Luz, Christmas festival, the largest in Brazil.
Festa da Colônia, event that celebrates the immigration history of the region.

Gramado is served by Canela Airport, located in the municipality of Canela, 8 km away.

Twin towns – sister cities

Gramado is twinned with:
 Angra do Heroísmo, Portugal
 Levico Terme, Italy
 Maldonado, Uruguay
 Óbidos, Portugal
 Bariloche, Argentina
 Puerto Varas, Chile

References
"Gramado, história de uma terra e seu povo ." Inema – Seu site de aventuras. 8 Sep 2006 <https://web.archive.org/web/20060221223030/http://inema.com.br/mat/idmat030671.htm>.
"História." City Brazil. 8 Sep 2006 <https://web.archive.org/web/20070322175050/http://www.citybrazil.com.br/rs/gramado/historia.htm>.

Notes

External links

Government Websites
Gramado Town Hall
Gramado Town Council

Maps
Gramado city detailed Street Map

Media Outlets
Jornal de Gramado – Weekly, Portuguese-speaking newspaper

Touristic Websites
Insider Guide of Gramado
Gramado and Canela Tourist Guide
Gramado Tourist Guide
Hotels in Gramado
Tourism and services Guide
What to do in Gramado

Official Events Websites
Gramado Worldwide Publicity Convention
Gramado Festival
Natal Luz
Calendar of Events

Municipalities in Rio Grande do Sul
Populated places established in 1875
1875 establishments in Brazil
German-Brazilian culture
Italian-Brazilian culture